Camptostylus ovalis is a species of plant in the family Achariaceae. It is found in Cameroon and Nigeria. Its natural habitat is subtropical or tropical dry forests. It is threatened by habitat loss.

References

Achariaceae
Near threatened plants
Taxonomy articles created by Polbot